POI v The Person Known as “Lina”' ([2011] EWHC 25(QB)) was a 2011 privacy case in which an injunction was granted restraining the publication of photographs. The case also involved blackmail and because of this the claimant was granted anonymity.

See also
DFT v TFD

References

External links
Bailii

English privacy case law
2011 in England
High Court of Justice cases
2011 in case law
2011 in the United Kingdom
Blackmail